This is a list of the mammal species recorded in the Maldives. There are eleven mammal species in the Maldives, of which one is vulnerable.

The following tags are used to highlight each species' conservation status as assessed by the International Union for Conservation of Nature:

Some species were assessed using an earlier set of criteria. Species assessed using this system have the following instead of near threatened and least concern categories:

Order: Sirenia (manatees and dugongs) 

Sirenia is an order of fully aquatic, herbivorous mammals that inhabit rivers, estuaries, coastal marine waters, swamps, and marine wetlands. All four species are endangered.

Family: Dugongidae
Genus: Dugong
 Dugong, D. dugon

Order: Chiroptera (bats) 

The bats' most distinguishing feature is that their forelimbs are developed as wings, making them the only mammals capable of flight. Bat species account for about 20% of all mammals.

Family: Pteropodidae (flying foxes, Old World fruit bats)
Subfamily: Pteropodinae
Genus: Pteropus
 Indian flying-fox, Pteropus giganteus LC
 Small flying-fox, Pteropus hypomelanus LC

Order: Cetacea (whales) 

The order Cetacea includes whales, dolphins and porpoises. They are the mammals most fully adapted to aquatic life with a spindle-shaped nearly hairless body, protected by a thick layer of blubber, and forelimbs and tail modified to provide propulsion underwater.

Suborder: Mysticeti
Family: Balaenopteridae
Subfamily: Balaenopterinae
Genus: Balaenoptera
 Minke whale, Balaenoptera acutorostrata LR/nt
 Bryde's whale, Balaenoptera edeni DD
 Sei whale, Balaenoptera borealis EN
 Fin whale, Balaenoptera physalus EN
 Blue whale, Balaenoptera musculus EN
Subfamily: Megapterinae
Genus: Megaptera
 Humpback whale, Megaptera novaeangliae CR (Arabian Sea Population)
Suborder: Odontoceti
Family: Physeteridae
Genus: Physeter
 Sperm whale, Physeter macrocephalus VU
Superfamily: Platanistoidea
Family: Kogiidae
Genus: Kogia
 Pygmy sperm whale, Kogia breviceps LR/lc
Family: Ziphidae
Subfamily: Hyperoodontinae
Genus: Indopacetus
 Longman's beaked whale, Indopacetus pacificus DD
Family: Delphinidae (marine dolphins)
Genus: Stenella
 Pantropical spotted dolphin, Stenella attenuata LR/cd
 Striped dolphin, Stenella coeruleoalba LR/cd
 Spinner dolphin, Stenella longirostris LR/cd
Genus: Lagenodelphis
 Fraser's dolphin, Lagenodelphis hosei DD
Genus: Grampus
 Risso's dolphin, Grampus griseus DD
Genus: Peponocephala
 Melon-headed whale, Peponocephala electra LR/lc
Superfamily Ziphioidea
Family: Ziphiidae
Genus: Mesoplodon
 Deraniyagala's beaked whale, Mesoplodon hotaula DD

Notes

References

See also
List of chordate orders
Lists of mammals by region
List of prehistoric mammals
Mammal classification
List of mammals described in the 2000s

.
Mammals
Maldives
 Maldives
Maldives